Dorsey & Whitney LLP (known as Dorsey) is an American law firm with over 500 lawyers, and a similar number of staff, located in 21 offices in the United States, Canada, Europe, and Asia. The firm's headquarters is in Minneapolis, Minnesota, where it was founded. As of 2023, Dorsey is led by managing partner William R. Stoeri. The firm's lawyers have included several prominent public figures, including former U.S. Vice President Walter Mondale. 

As of 2023, Dorsey employs approximately 575 lawyers spread across 21 offices worldwide.

History
Dorsey was founded in 1912 by William Lancaster, a director of First National Bank of Minneapolis (now part of U.S. Bank), and David Simpson, a judge on the Minnesota Supreme Court. The following year, they hired James Dorsey as their first associate. Dorsey left the firm in the 1920s to become an investment banker, but returned to the firm a few years after the 1929 stock market crash. Dorsey led the firm until his death in 1959. The name of the firm continued to change for most of its history, until it was shortened into its current, permanent name in 1981. Dorsey continues to build on its traditional strengths in corporate law and litigation through a wide range of practice groups.

The firm has also endowed the Dorsey and Whitney Professor of Law at the University of Minnesota Law School.

Notable alumni
Harry Blackmun, former U.S. Supreme Court justice 
Amy Klobuchar, U.S. Senator
Walter Mondale, former Vice President of the United States 
William Prosser, legal scholar.  
Tom Vilsack, former Governor of Iowa

Key clients
According to Corporate Counsel, Dorsey has been identified as the Go-To firm for the following Top 500 companies:
3M (Labor, Litigation)
C.H. Robinson Worldwide (Corporate Transactions, International, Labor, Litigation, Securities)
Charter Communications (Labor)
CHS (Corporate Transactions, Securities)
Dana (Corporate Transactions)
General Mills (Corporate Transactions, International)
Hormel Foods (Litigation)
Mosaic (Corporate Transactions, Labor, Securities)
SuperValu (Litigation)
UnitedHealth Group (Labor, Securities)
Wells Fargo (Labor)
Xcel Energy (Labor, Regulatory)

Other key clients:
ADC Telecommunications
Canon
Cisco
Fair Isaac
HSBC
Marks & Spencer
Mayo Clinic
Northwest Airlines
USBancorp

Assistance to Guantanamo captives

Joshua Colangelo-Bryan, an attorney with Dorsey & Whitney prepared the habeas corpus petition for the six Bahraini citizens held in extrajudicial detention in the United States Guantanamo Bay detention camps, in Cuba.
Juma al Dossari, one of Colangelo-Bryan's clients, made a suicide attempt during Colangelo-Bryan's visit.

Charles "Cully" Stimson, then
Deputy Assistant Secretary of Defense for Detainee Affairs, stirred controversy when he went on record criticizing the patriotism of law firms that allowed employees to assist Guantanamo captives:
"corporate CEOs seeing this should ask firms to choose between lucrative retainers and representing terrorists."

Stimson's views were widely criticized.  The Pentagon disavowed them and he resigned shortly thereafter.

Insider trading controversy
In 2008, police uncovered an insider trading conspiracy involving Dorsey & Whitney partner Gil Cornblum, who there and earlier in his career at Sullivan & Cromwell in New York discovered inside information and, with his con-conspirator, Stanko "Stan" Grmovsek– a former lawyer and Cornblum's law school classmate –was found to have gained over $10 million in illegal profits over a 14-year span. Cornblum committed suicide by jumping from a bridge as he was under investigation and shortly before he was to be arrested but before criminal charges were laid against him, one day before his alleged co-conspirator pled guilty.

See also
 Tip and Trade
 Insider trading

References

External links
Dorsey & Whitney website
Chambers and Partners USA Profile 
Dorsey & Whitney: A Minneapolis Law Firm in Transition (Star Tribune)

Law firms established in 1912
Law firms based in Minneapolis
1912 establishments in Minnesota
Foreign law firms with offices in Hong Kong